First Things First is an American sports and entertainment talk show starring Nick Wright, Chris Broussard, and Kevin Wildes. Originally titled First Things First with Cris Carter and Nick Wright, the series premiered on Fox Sports 1 on September 5, 2017. The show was also released as a podcast and radio simulcast.

Development
FS1 hired former NFL wide receiver Cris Carter and local sports radio host Nick Wright to co-host First Things First. Shortly after, former Today correspondent Jenna Wolfe was brought on to join Carter and Wright on the show.

History
The show premiered on September 5, 2017, and featured Carter and Wright debating sports topics, with Wolfe serving as co-host and moderator. Carter last appeared on the show on October 30, 2019. While some sports media outlets reported that Carter and network executives disagreed over him being left off Fox Sport's Thursday Night Football pregame broadcast, neither Carter nor Fox Sports gave a reasoning for his departure. A spokesperson for the network only commented that Carter "is no longer with Fox Sports," without further elaboration. Former NFL defensive lineman Chris Canty briefly filled-in for Carter.

Following Carter's departure from the show, Fox Sports looked to pivot First Things First into a "second iteration" that would feature "a loose, free-flowing, conversational format and add a still-to-be-determined fourth talent to the set," in addition to Carter's permanent replacement. In February 2020, television producer and development executive Kevin Wildes was announced to join Wright and Wolfe on the show. In August 2020, former NFL wide receiver Brandon Marshall was announced as the fourth on-air personality as First Things First fully shifted to a panel format.

Marshall's tenure on the show lasted until August 2021. Later that month, sports media journalist and reporter Chris Broussard, who made frequent appearances as an NBA analyst on the show, was named as an official host on the show. Wolfe made her final appearance on the show in August 2022.

After Wolfe's departure, the show went on a brief hiatus before it premiered in a new afternoon time slot on September 6, 2022.

Viewership
In May 2019, the Associated Press reported that viewership for First Things First "increased 30 percent in a year while averaging 61,000 viewers."

References

2010s American television news shows
2017 American television series debuts
2020s American television news shows
American podcasts
American sports radio programs
American sports television series
Fox Sports 1 original programming
Simulcasts